Julio Héctor Estrada Domínguez (born 22 June 1974) is a Guatemalan politician and economist. He served as Guatemala's Minister of Finance from 2016 until September 2018.

References

Living people
Finance ministers of Guatemala
Guatemalan economists
Government ministers of Guatemala
1962 births